Hryhoriy Nemyria is the First Deputy Chairman of the Foreign Affairs Committee of the Parliament of Ukraine and Deputy Chairman of the Batkivshchyna.

Family
Nemyria is married; he has a son and a daughter.

Education

Nemyria comes from Donetsk, where he began his academic career. He has an MA in History from Donetsk University and a Ph.D. from Kyiv Shevchenko University. He became Vice-Rector of the National University of Kyiv Mohyla Academy and chaired the European Integration Department of the National Academy of Public Administration. He is also a graduate of the National Security Program at the John F. Kennedy School of Government, Harvard.

Career
In the previous Rada convocations, Dr. Nemyria chaired the Committees on European Integration and on Human Rights. He served as Deputy Prime Minister in the government of Prime Minister Tymoshenko (2007-2010). He was Governor from Ukraine in the World Bank and Co-Chairman of the Ukraine-China Intergovernmental Commission on Trade and Economic Cooperation.

From 2006-2007, Nemyria was the Deputy Head of the Parliamentary Delegation to the PACE and the Ukrainian delegation to the Committee on Parliamentary Cooperation between Ukraine and the EU. In Tymoshenko's first government (2005), he served as her Foreign Policy Advisor.

Other Activities
Nemyria was chief editor of the scientific journal New Security, and head of the Department of European Integration of the National Academy of Public Administration President of Ukraine. At various times he also served as a consultant to the Verkhovna Rada of Ukraine on European integration, was the chief advisor to MDCSU Ukraine, and advisor to the Prime Minister of Ukraine, Yulia Tymoshenko.

Positions held
 Member of the Center for Strategic and International Studies (CSIS, Washington 1994)
 Member of the International Institute for Strategic Studies (IISS, London)
 Member of the Advisory Council for Central and Eastern Europe at Freedom House

Earnings 
According to an electronic declaration, in 2019, Hryhoriy Nemyria received ₴1,052,192 (US$38,970) as salary and reimbursement of expenses as deputy of the Verkhovna Rada. On bank accounts, Nemyria had US$22,896, €8,619 and ₴39,919. He also declared US$87,800 and ₴200,000 in cash. Additionally, Hryhoriy Nemyria had an apartment (total area of 81,54 m²) and cottage (total area of 361,2 m²). Hryhoriy Nemyria also declared a 2009  MAZDA CX-7 car.

References

External links

 Handbook "Who's Who in Ukraine", publishing "K.I.S"

1960 births
Living people
Politicians from Donetsk
All-Ukrainian Union "Fatherland" politicians
Vice Prime Ministers of Ukraine
European integration ministers of Ukraine
Fifth convocation members of the Verkhovna Rada
Sixth convocation members of the Verkhovna Rada
Seventh convocation members of the Verkhovna Rada
Eighth convocation members of the Verkhovna Rada
Ninth convocation members of the Verkhovna Rada
Soviet historians
20th-century Ukrainian historians
Ukrainian political scientists
Donetsk National University alumni
Academic staff of the National University of Kyiv-Mohyla Academy